John Edward Harris (born June 13, 1956) is a former American football safety in the National Football League. He was drafted by the Seattle Seahawks in the seventh round of the 1978 NFL Draft. He played college football at Arizona State.

Harris also played for the Minnesota Vikings.

Professional career

Seattle Seahawks
Harris was drafted by the Seattle Seahawks in the seventh round of the 1978 NFL Draft. He played eight years for the team from 1978 to 1985. During that time he started 111 of 119 games and had 41 interceptions, returning two for touchdowns. In 1981 he had a team high 10 interceptions, 2 of which he returned for touchdowns. Harris had four seasons with the Seattle Seahawks in which he would have 6 interceptions or more.

Minnesota Vikings
In 1986 Harris was traded to the Minnesota Vikings. He played three years for the team from 1986 to 1988. During that time he started 37 of 41 games, recording nine interceptions and two sacks.

After the 1988 season Harris retired after 11 years in the NFL. He finished his career starting 148 of 160 games, recording 50 interceptions, two touchdowns, a sack, and 12 fumble recoveries.

References

External links
Pro Football Reference

1955 births
Living people
Players of American football from Columbus, Georgia
American football safeties
Arizona State Sun Devils football players
Seattle Seahawks players
Minnesota Vikings players